Chittenden County Transportation Authority (CCTA) was the public transit system headquartered in Burlington in Chittenden County, Vermont. CCTA served the communities of Burlington, Essex, South Burlington, Winooski, Shelburne, Williston and Milton. As well as providing regular bus routes to these member municipalities, CCTA also served parts of Colchester and had express routes for commuters travelling between Burlington and Montpelier, Middlebury, and St. Albans.

On March 17, 2014, a strike by the bus drivers' union shut down bus service, which was restored on April 4, 2014, after settlement of the strike.

On January 22, 2016, it was announced that the CCTA will be renamed to Green Mountain Transit, completing a merger with the Green Mountain Transit Authority to become a regional system. As of October 2016, the merger has been completed.

Transit center, buses and routes
CCTA's transit center was located on Cherry Street in downtown Burlington. Most of the local routes operated from the portion of the terminal which occupies the south side of Cherry Street from Church Street to west of Saint Paul Street. All of the commuter and express routes (36, 46, 56, 76, 86, 96) were operated from Pearl Street in the vicinity of Saint Paul Street. As of May 2015, a replacement terminal was under construction on Saint Paul Street, between Pearl and Cherry Streets. The "Downtown Transit Center" was scheduled to be completed in 2016. The Downtown Transit Center opened October 13, 2016, in conjunction with the merger with the GMTA.

Most of the fleet is made up of Gillig low-floor transit buses, although a number of older RTS transit buses remain in use, particularly on Burlington Neighborhood Special (school bus) routes. In recent years, MCI long-distance buses and various shuttle buses built on Ford F350 chassis have been purchased for intercity routes and transit service in outlying towns, respectively.

Local routes 

Most local routes operated Monday through Saturday with 30-minute service patterns during the day, with most services leaving Cherry Street at :15 and :45 after the hour. Some busier routes have 15-minute service during rush hours. Rush hours are generally 6:30 to 9:00 AM and 3:00 to 6:30 PM weekdays.

(*) denotes routes with 15-minute service.
NB: Northbound; SB: Southbound

Commuter and express routes 
Commuter and express routes operate weekday rush periods only unless otherwise noted and are limited stop.

Shopping specials 

These are shuttle buses that each operate one day per week, in the morning, to/from senior housing centers. The general public is welcome on these routes.

(*) denotes Burlington destinations

Fare schedule 
(information is current as of June 18, 2013)

$1.25 per one-way trip on local routes ($0.60 for discount qualified riders)
$12.00 for Adult 10-ride pass ($6.00 for discount qualified riders)
$50.00 for Adult monthly (31-day) pass ($25.00 for discount qualified riders)

Free transfers are available for those needing to connect one-way on another bus. They are not valid for round trips. Fletcher Allen Health Care employees may receive a 25% discount on LINK Express passes. University of Vermont, St. Michael's College, Champlain College and Middlebury College students may receive free bus fare for most CCTA routes. No discount fares are currently available on Local Commuter or LINK Express routes.

LINK Express route fares
$4.00 per one-way trip
$150 for Adult Monthly Pass (valid on all CCTA and GMTA routes)
$40 for 10-ride pass

Local commuter route fares
$2.00 per one-way trip
$75 for Adult Monthly Pass (valid on all CCTA and GMTA routes)
$20 for 10-ride pass

References

External links
 CCTA Webpage

Bus transportation in Vermont